The National Forestry and Grassland Administration is an administration of the People's Republic of China, in charge of the national forestry affairs. It was founded in 1949 as Ministry of Forestry and Farming. On November 5, 1951, it changed to Ministry of Forestry, and the farming section was transferred to Ministry of Agriculture. On March 10, 1998, it was renamed State Forestry Administration. On 10 April 2018, following a wider national institution reform, the name was changed to State Forestry and Grassland Administration. The administration is under management of the Ministry of Natural Resources.

List of directors (ministers) 
Liang Xi (Oct. 19, 1949 - Jun 4, 1956)
Liu Wenhui (Apr. 28, 1959 - Oct. 6, 1967)
Wang Yun (Oct. 6, 1967 - ?) (director of military administration commission of Ministry of Forestry)
Luo Yuchuan (Feb. 16, 1979 - Aug. 30, 1980)
Yong Wentao (Aug. 30, 1980 - Apr. 9, 1982)
Yang Zhong (Apr. 9, 1982 - Jun. 23, 1987)
Gao Dezhan (Jun. 23, 1987 - Mar. 29, 1993)
Xu Youfang (Mar. 29, 1993 - Aug. 29, 1997)
Chen Yaobang (Aug. 29, 1997 - Apr. 5, 1998)
Wang Zhibao (Apr. 5, 1998 - Dec. 2, 2000)
Zhou Shengxian (Dec. 2, 2000 - Dec. 2, 2005)
Jia Zhibang (Dec. 2, 2005 - March 30, 2012)
Zhao Shucong (March 30, 2012 - July 16, 2015)
Zhang Jianlong (July 16, 2015 - June 8, 2020)
Guan Zhiou (June 8, 2020 - )

References

External links 
Official website of the State Forestry and Grassland Administration

Government agencies of China
China
State Council of the People's Republic of China
1949 establishments in China
Government agencies established in 1949
Forestry in China